Heidecksburg is a Baroque palace in Rudolstadt, Thuringia, and served as the residence of the princes to Schwarzburg-Rudolstadt. It is located prominently approximately 60 m above the old town. After a fire in 1735 and its reconstruction, it has remained intact, including during World War II.

External links
 www.heidecksburg.de
 www.thueringerschloesser.de

Palaces in Thuringia
Rudolstadt
Museums in Thuringia
Historic house museums in Germany
Buildings and structures in Saalfeld-Rudolstadt